Enrique Lucero (October 9, 1920 – May 9, 1989) was a Mexican-American film actor. He was known for such films as Macario (1960) and Two Mules for Sister Sara (1970). He also played the role of the "Indian Chief" in Buck and the Preacher (1972), Sidney Poitier's directorial debut, and Geronimo in the 1979 miniseries Mr. Horn.

Selected filmography

 La historia del tango (1949) - Ángel Villalva Jr.
 La voz de mi ciudad (1953)
 The Road of Life (1956) - Lic. José Gutiérrez
 Sierra Baron (1958) - Anselmo
 Villa!! (1958) - Tenorio
 Pistolas de oro (1959)
 The Little Savage (1959) - Bit Role (uncredited)
 Beyond All Limits (1959)
 Sonatas (1959) - Militar prisionero
 Bendito entre las mujeres (1959) - (uncredited)
 La Fièvre Monte à El Pao (1959) - Vila (uncredited)
 Macario (1960) - La muerte
 Simitrio (1960) - Papá de Simitrio (uncredited)
 ¡Viva la soldadera! (1960) - (uncredited)
 The Magnificent Seven (1960) - Villager #1
 Rosa Blanca (1961) - Blas Urrutia
 Paraíso escondido (1962)
 La noche del jueves (1962) - Julio
 El tejedor de milagros (1962) - Arnulfo
 The Bloody Vampire (1962) - Lazaro
 The Extra (1962) - Actor, sacerdote azteca
 Tiburoneros (1963) - Rubén
 La invasión de los vampiros (1963) - Lázaro
 Corazón de niño (1963) - Maestro Robles
 El beso de ultratumba (1963) - El vagabundo
 The Curse of the Crying Woman (1963) - Dr. Daniel Jaramillo
 Cri Cri el grillito cantor (1963) - Don Cosme
 Una cara para escapar (1963)
 El revólver sangriento (1964) - Pedro
 The Golden Cockerel (1964) - El Chinaco
 Love Has Many Faces (1965) - Lt. Riccardo Andrade
 Major Dundee (1965) - Doctor Aguilar
 Always Further On (1965) - Brujo Owiruane
 Pistoleros del oeste (1965)
 Los sheriffs de la frontera (1965)
 Pacto de sangre (1966)
 Tarzan and the Valley of Gold (1966) - Perez
 Los mediocres (1966) - Arcadio Buendia (segment "Las Cucarachas")
 El indomable (1966)
 Retablos de la Guadalupana (1967)
 Rocambole contra la secta del escorpión (1967) - Emir Hassan Ali
 La carcachita (1967)
 Traitors of San Angel (1967) - Rodriguez
 The Bandits (1967) - (uncredited)
 Guns for San Sebastian (1968) - Renaldo
 Le Rapace (1968) - El Bosco
 Valentín de la Sierra (1968)
 El caballo Bayo (1969)
 The Wild Bunch (1969) - Ignacio
 Butch Cassidy and the Sundance Kid (1969) - Guard in the 1st Bolivian Bank (uncredited)
 Shark! (1969) - Inspector Barok
 Estafa de amor (1970)
 El despertar del lobo (1970) - Vidente oriental
 Two Mules for Sister Sara (1970) - 3rd American
 La vida inútil de Pito Pérez (1970)
 Los amores de Chucho el Roto (1970)
 Emiliano Zapata (1970) - Jesús Guajardo
 The Bridge in the Jungle (1971) - Perez
 Eye for an Eye (1971) - Lobo
 Something Big (1971) - Indian spy
 Santo contra los cazadores de cabezas (1971) - Husca
 Buck and the Preacher (1972) - Indian Chief
 The Revengers (1972) - (uncredited)
 Aguirre, the Wrath of God (1972) - Nacho
 La Scoumoune (1972) - Le Mexicain / Migli
 The Long Goodbye (1973) - Jefe
 Those Years (1973) - Juan Nepomuceno Almonte
 Renzo, el gitano (1973)
 I Escaped from Devil's Island (1973) - Esteban
 Presagio (1974) - Héctor
 La muerte de Pancho Villa (1974)
 Peregrina (1974) - Hermengildo Rodríguez
 Bring Me the Head of Alfredo Garcia (1974) - Esteban
 Mary, Mary, Bloody Mary (1975) - Lieutenant Pons
 The House in the South (1975) - Ramón
 Las fuerzas vivas (1975) - Mateo
 Canoa (1976) - El señor cura
 The Return of a Man Called Horse (1976) - Raven
 La virgen de Guadalupe (1976) - Tío Bernardino
 Las poquianchis (1976) - Capitán
 Maten al león (1977) - Vicepresidente Cardona
 El viaje (1977) - Enrique Jiménez
 Los de abajo (1978)
 The Children of Sanchez (1978)
 Ratero (1979) - Gallo
 La guerra santa (1979) - Rutilo Sandoval
 Guyana: Crime of the Century (1979) - Commune member
 Eagle's Wing (1979) - The Sharman
 Mr. Horn (1979 - Geronimo
 A paso de cojo (1980)
 The Octagon (1980) - One Armed Man
 Green Ice (1981) - Lucho the Coffee Grower
 Ángel del barrio (1981) - Patada (Kick)
 Un hombre llamado el diablo (1983)
 Under Fire (1983) - Prison Priest
 Todo un hombre (1983) - Juvencio
 The Evil That Men Do (1984) - Aristos
 Little Treasure (1985) - Priest
 La revancha (1985)
 El trailer asesino (1986)
 Murieron a la mitad del rio (1986)
 El tres de copas (1986)
 Al filo de la ley: Misión rescate (1986) - Comandante
 Gaby: A True Story (1987) - Minister of Education
 The Last Tunnel (1987) - Juan Penagos
 Treasure of the Moon Goddess (1987) - Tupak
 Los confines (1989) - Tanilo
 El jinete de la divina providencia (1989)
 Mi pistola y tus esposas (1989) - (final film role)

References

External links 

1920 births
1989 deaths
Male actors from Chihuahua (state)
Mexican male film actors
American male film actors
Mexican emigrants to the United States